Öğündük is a village in the İdil District of Şırnak Province in Turkey. The village is populated by Assyrians and Kurds and had a population of 367 in 2021.

It was historically an Assyrian village with the presence of thirty-one different clans. Kurds of the Domanan tribe later settled in the village and the Assyrians went under the patronage of the tribe. In present time, a large majority of the Assyrian population has left the village and some Assyrian families consider themselves part of the Domanan tribe.

History

Midun (today called Öğündük) was probably named after the nearby Roman border fort of Mindon by the border with the Sasanian Empire in the Melabas
Hills of Tur Abdin. The efforts of the Roman general Belisarius to construct the fort in 528 prompted a battle in which the Romans were defeated as per Procopius' History of the Wars.

Midun was later looted by the emir Bidayn in 1714 and the Kurdish rebel Yezdanşêr in 1855.

A section of the village called Sanhatkar was settled by Armenians who had fled from Palu due to the Hamidian massacres. It was visited by the English traveller Mark Sykes in the early 20th century.

A significant number of the village's Assyrian population emigrated abroad to Germany, Switzerland, and Belgium in the late 20th century. In 1999, Öğündük was inhabited by 50 Assyrian families. In 2007, 257 Assyrians in 50 families inhabited Öğündük.

References
Notes

Citations

Bibliography

Villages in İdil District
Kurdish settlements in Şırnak Province
Assyrian communities in Turkey
Tur Abdin